The professional journal Advances in Archaeological Practice is published by Cambridge University Press, on behalf of the Society of American Archaeology, an organization of professional archaeologists of the Americas. Established in 2013, it is the SAA's newest journal.

History
Advances in Archaeological Practice is a quarterly, full-color digital journal published, with articles sharing 'creative solutions to challenges in the practice of archaeology globally'. The purpose of the journal is to provide a venue for archaeologists to publish  short, peer-reviewed, methodologically oriented articles.

A unique feature of this journal is the freely accessible  'digital media reviews' section. These articles are a 1500-2000 word critical evaluation of one (or a series of) digital application(s) developed for archaeology and heritage audiences. Previous articles in this section have reviewed heritage/archaeology online exhibitions, video games, digital archives, podcasts, chatbots, news programmes, Sketchfab, Instagram, Facebook, crowdsourcing sites, and more generally on VR and AR applications, and online public courses (e.g. MOOCs).

Editorial board 

The editorial advisory board of Advances in Archaeological Practice has 21 members from around the world, including a mix of academic, consulting and government archaeologists.

References

External links

 Advances in Archaeological Practice
 The Society for American Archaeology

Archaeology journals
Quarterly journals
Cambridge University Press academic journals